Centrosome-associated protein 350 is a protein that in humans is encoded by the CEP350 gene.

CEP350 is a large protein with a CAP-Gly domain typically found in cytoskeleton-associated proteins. It primarily localizes to the centrosome, a non-membraneous organelle that functions as the major microtubule-organizing center in animal cells. CEP350 is required to anchor microtubules at the centrosome. Furthermore, it increases the stability of growing centrioles.

It is also implicated in the regulation of a class of nuclear hormone receptors in the nucleus. Several alternatively spliced transcript variants have been found, but their full-length nature has not been determined.

References

External links

Further reading

Centrosome